The Richmond River Herald and Northern Districts Advertiser was a newspaper published in Coraki, New South Wales, Australia from 1886 until 1942.

History
The Richmond River Herald was first published on 9 July 1886 by Louis Ferdinand Branxton Benaud, the great-uncle of Richie Benaud. The first issue was almost never printed as the office and newspaper plant had been in flames a few hours before it was due to be printed. Louis Benaud made a career out of advocating for Coraki's interests and in the third issue the Herald argued for Coraki's incorporation into a municipality.

The Richmond River Herald ceased publication on 26 June 1942.

Digitisation
The paper has been digitised as part of the Australian Newspapers Digitisation Program project of the National Library of Australia.

See also
 List of newspapers in Australia
 List of newspapers in New South Wales

References

External links
 

Defunct newspapers published in New South Wales
Newspapers on Trove